Christian Ehring (born 18 September 1972 in Duisburg) is a German comedian and author.

Life 
Ehring works as a comedian at German theatres, and has appeared on a variety of television programs broadcast by German outlets. He has written several books. He lives in Düsseldorf, and has two children.

Works 
 1998: Generation XXL. (Die Scheinheiligen) CD, Con Anima
 2004: Anchorman. Ein Nachrichtensprecher sieht rot. CD, Con Anima
 2007: Couch. Ein Heimatabend. (Das Kom(m)ödchen) DVD with Heiko Seidel, Maike Kühl and Christian Ehring
 2010: Sushi. Ein Requiem. (Das Kom(m)ödchen) DVD with Heiko Seidel, Maike Kühl and Christian Ehring
 2013: Freaks. Eine Abrechnung. (Das Kom(m)ödchen) DVD with Heiko Seidel, Maike Kühl and Christian Ehring
 2016: Keine weiteren Fragen CD, Con Anima
 2017: Keine weiteren Fragen. Doppel-CD, Con Anima

Awards 
 2004: Handelsblatt-Förderpreis Sprungbrett
 2004: Westspitzen-Preis (Sparte Kabarett)
 2005: Goldener Rostocker Koggenzieher
 2009: Leipziger Löwenzahn (Ensemble des Kom(m)ödchens)
 2009: Deutscher Comedypreis 2009 (for member of heute-show)
 2009: Adolf-Grimme-Preis 2010 (for member of heute-show)
 2010: Deutscher Comedypreis 2010 (for member of heute-show)
 2012: Deutscher Comedypreis 2012 (for member of heute-show)
 2016: Nordrhein-Westfälischer Kleinkunstpreis „Bocholter Pepperoni"
 2017: Berliner Kabarettpreis der EDDI
 2017: Düsseldorfer des Jahres in category culture

References

External links 

 Literature from and about Christian Ehring in the German National Library (in German)
 NordWestZeitung: Selbstfindund der Besonderen Art (in German)
 Rheinisch Post: GroKo lustiger als Karneval (in German)
 NDR.de: Alles über Christian Ehring (in German)
 Focus.de: Christian Ehring, Keine weiteren Fragen (in German)
 Spiegel.de: Mir ist die Kinnlade runtergefallen (in German)

German male comedians
German satirists
People from Duisburg
1972 births
Living people
ZDF people
Norddeutscher Rundfunk people